The following is a list of prisoner-of-war camps in the Soviet Union during World War II. The Soviet Union had not signed the Geneva convention relative to the Treatment of Prisoners of War in 1929.

Polish POWs
On September 19, 1939,  Lavrenty Beria (the People's Commissar for Internal Affairs) ordered Pyotr Soprunenko to set up the NKVD Administration for Affairs of Prisoners of War and Internees to manage camps for Polish prisoners. The following camps were established to hold members of the Polish Army:
Yukhnovo (rail station of Babynino),
Yuzhe (Talitsy)
Kozelsk
Kozelshchyna
Oranki
Stolbnyi Island on Lake Seliger near Ostashkov (ru)
Putyvl (rail station of Tyotkino),
Starobelsk (ru)
Vologod (rail station of Zaenikevo),
Gryazovets

German POWs
Voikovo prison camp

Hungarian POWs 
Komsomolsk-on-Amur

Notes

.
.01
P
Soviet Union
Pow Camps
.Pow Camps